Wandoor Siva Temple is a temple located at Wandoor (also known as Vandur), a town in Malappuram district in the state of Kerala, India. This temple is an old temple, which holds a spiritual atmosphere around the temple. The Temple has a big pond, where the devotees purify themselves.

References

Shiva temples in Kerala
Hindu temples in Malappuram district